The 1978–79 NBA season was the Hawks' 30th season in the NBA and 11th season in Atlanta.

Roster

Regular season

Season standings

z - clinched division title
y - clinched division title
x - clinched playoff spot

Record vs. opponents

Playoffs

|- align="center" bgcolor="#ccffcc"
| 1
| April 11
| @ Houston
| W 109–106
| Dan Roundfield (23)
| Dan Roundfield (18)
| Hawes, Criss (4)
| The Summit14,405
| 1–0
|- align="center" bgcolor="#ccffcc"
| 2
| April 13
| Houston
| W 100–91
| Drew, Johnson (25)
| John Drew (13)
| Eddie Johnson (8)
| Omni Coliseum15,798
| 2–0
|-

|- align="center" bgcolor="#ffcccc"
| 1
| April 15
| @ Washington
| L 89–103
| Dan Roundfield (24)
| Dan Roundfield (10)
| Armond Hill (8)
| Capital Centre15,721
| 0–1
|- align="center" bgcolor="#ccffcc"
| 2
| April 17
| @ Washington
| W 107–99
| Roundfield, Johnson (17)
| Tree Rollins (8)
| Armond Hill (6)
| Capital Centre19,035
| 1–1
|- align="center" bgcolor="#ffcccc"
| 3
| April 20
| Washington
| L 77–89
| John Drew (13)
| Roundfield, Rollins (14)
| Armond Hill (5)
| Omni Coliseum15,798
| 1–2
|- align="center" bgcolor="#ffcccc"
| 4
| April 22
| Washington
| L 115–120 (OT)
| Dan Roundfield (22)
| Dan Roundfield (18)
| Dan Roundfield (7)
| Omni Coliseum15,798
| 1–3
|- align="center" bgcolor="#ccffcc"
| 5
| April 24
| @ Washington
| W 107–103
| Terry Furlow (21)
| Dan Roundfield (14)
| Armond Hill (5)
| Capital Centre19,035
| 2–3
|- align="center" bgcolor="#ccffcc"
| 6
| April 26
| Washington
| W 104–86
| Drew, Johnson (22)
| Steve Hawes (14)
| Armond Hill (9)
| Omni Coliseum15,978
| 3–3
|- align="center" bgcolor="#ffcccc"
| 7
| April 29
| @ Washington
| L 94–100
| John Drew (24)
| John Drew (8)
| Eddie Johnson (6)
| Capital Centre19,035
| 3–4
|-

Awards and records
"Fast Eddie" Johnson, NBA All-Defensive Second Team

References

Atlanta Hawks seasons
Atlanta
Atlanta
Atlanta